Hans-Günter Bruns (born 15 November 1954) is a German former professional footballer who played as a midfielder.

Overview
Bruns was a typical German footballer. Powerfully built, technically good, strong in the tackle, and tactically excellent.

Bruns was at Gladbach twice, his second stint reaching 10 years and encompassing 301 Bundesliga appearances with 55 goals scored.
As a player, Bruns was the type to make bursting runs from deep in midfield. He supported attacks, instigated moves and helped defend his back-line. German football in the '70s and '80s had plenty of great players in that position.

Having started out as a midfielder for Schalke, the North Rhine-Westphalia-born star eventually evolved into one of the finest sweepers of his generation. Part of the Gladbach side that went all the way to 1979 UEFA Cup glory, Bruns is part of Bundesliga folklore for a moment during an encounter with Bayern where he ran past almost every opposition player before seeing his shot strike both posts and fail to go in.

Years after his retirement,  he achieved mild publicity as a result of a video shared on various video streaming and social media sites. The video, showing a clip from a 1983 match between Borussia Mönchengladbach and FC Bayern Munich, and titled The Greatest Goal Never Scored, showed Bruns collecting the ball under pressure near his own corner flag, beating three Bayern Munich players as he ran almost the entire length of the pitch, exchanging a pass with a Borussia Mönchengladbach striker that allowed him on goal, only for his shot to hit the inside of one post, roll across goal and hit the other post, before rebounding into the arms of the Munich keeper.

Career
Bruns did not register with a football club in his hometown until he was 11 years old, having spent many years playing soccer on the street. At 17, he moved to Schalke 04.

In the Bundesliga he was from 1973 to 1990 for FC Schalke 04, SG Wattenscheid 09, Fortuna Dusseldorf and Borussia Mönchengladbach active. In his first years as a professional, he played in midfield, later especially on the Libero position. In 1979, he was in the squad of the team Borussia Mönchengladbach, the UEFA Cup winner, and scored on the way to the final matches against Red Star Belgrade, in which he did not participate, one goal against Benfica and Manchester City. In 1980 he was DFB Cup winner with Fortuna Dusseldorf, 1984 he lost with Borussia Mönchengladbach in the final of the same competition to FC Bayern Munich on penalties.

Bruns is responsible for one of the most famous posts goal of Bundesliga history. In the 1983/84 season he sprinted in Munich in the game against Bayern with a solo run past the opposing team behind the entire field. His shot hit the left inner post, the ball rolled on the goal line to the right post and jumped from there back into the field, where the Munich defense could then clear.

International career
He earned four caps for the West Germany national football team in 1984, and was included in the West German team for the 1984 UEFA European Football Championship, but did not play.

Coaching career
After retiring from professional football, Bruns initially worked as an insurance agent. In addition, he trained Adler Osterfeld in the Oberliga Nordrhein, later the VfB Speldorf in his hometown Mülheim and the SSVg Velbert. From 2006 he was coach of Rot-Weiß Oberhausen and led the club in 2007 as the champion of the Oberliga Nordrhein back to the Regionalliga and in the successor season 2008 in the 2nd Bundesliga. In the season 2008/09 he moved to Rot-Weiss Oberhausen on the position of Sporting Director and thus exchanged with Jürgen Lugingerthe tasks. After Luginger had due to a persistent negative series on 1 February 2010 made his post available, Bruns jumped in as interim coach. On April 22, 2010, however, it was announced that he will retain both offices permanently in the 2010-11 season. On February 22, 2011 was decided after the 1: 3 against VfL Osnabrück and due to disagreements within the club, to separate. Hans Günter Bruns was replaced one day later by Theo Schneider. [3]

On September 22, 2011 Bruns was introduced as the new coach of the regional league Wuppertal SV. He took over the succession of Karsten Hutwelker, from which the club had split three days earlier. [4] In November 2012 Bruns was released again from his duties in Wuppertal. After a half year break, he took over again in April 2013, the coaching post at the SSVg Velbert, but had to give it back in November 2013 due to the athletic descent of the club again.

In April 2014, the Oberhausen country league DJK Arminia Klosterhardt announced that he had committed Bruns as head coach for the new 2014–15 season. There he followed Michael Lorenz.

On 10 February 2020, he was appointed head coach of SC 1920 Oberhausen.

Honours
SG Wattenscheid 09
 Bundesliga runner-up: 1976–77

Fortuna Düsseldorf
 DFB-Pokal: 1979–80
 Cup Winner's Cup finalist: 1979–80

Borussia Mönchengladbach
 UEFA Cup: 1978–79
 DFB-Pokal finalist: 1983–84

References

External links
 
 
 

1954 births
Living people
Sportspeople from Mülheim
Association football midfielders
German footballers
German football managers
Germany international footballers
UEFA Euro 1984 players
FC Schalke 04 players
Fortuna Düsseldorf players
Borussia Mönchengladbach players
SG Wattenscheid 09 players
UEFA Cup winning players
Bundesliga players
2. Bundesliga players
SSVg Velbert managers
Wuppertaler SV managers
2. Bundesliga managers
Footballers from North Rhine-Westphalia